Berk Balaban (born 1 January 2000) is a Turkish professional footballer who plays as a goalkeeper for the Turkish club İskenderun in the TFF Second League.

Career

Galatasaray 
Balaban is a youth product of Galatasaray, and signed his first professional contract with the club in 2019.

Ankaraspor (loan)
After a season as Galatasaray's reserve goalkeeper, he went on loan with Ankaraspor for the 2020–21 season.

Return to Galatasaray
He made his professional debut with Galatasaray in a 1–1 UEFA Europa League tie with St Johnstone F.C., coming on as a substitute in the 55th minute as the starting goalkeeper Fernando Muslera got a red card.

Niğde Anadolu (loan)
On 8 February 2022, Balaban was loaned to TFF Second League club Niğde Anadolu for the rest of the season.

İskenderun FK (loan)
On 23 August 2022, Galatasaray was leased to the TFF Second League team İskenderun for 1 year.

References

External links
 

2000 births
Living people
Footballers from Istanbul
Turkish footballers
Association football goalkeepers
Galatasaray S.K. footballers
Ankaraspor footballers
Niğde Anadolu FK footballers
Süper Lig players
TFF First League players
TFF Second League players
İskenderun FK footballers